National Customs is a 1935 Chinese film directed by Luo Mingyou and Zhu Shilin. The film was silent film star Ruan Lingyu's last performance before she died in 1935.

This film is a propaganda film promoting the New Life Movement, which was launched in 1934.

Cast 
Lim Cho Cho as Zhang Jie, a rural school principal
Ruan Lingyu as Zhang Lan, Zhang Jie's elder daughter
Li Lili as Zhang Tao, Zhang Jie's younger daughter
Zheng Junli as Chen Zuo, a cousin of the Zhang sisters
Luo Peng as Xu Boyang, a classmate

External links 

1935 films
Chinese silent films
Chinese propaganda films
Chinese drama films
1935 drama films
Chinese black-and-white films
Silent drama films